Tokishi Station is the name of one current and one former train station in Japan.

 Tokishi Station (Gifu) (土岐市駅), a JR Central station in Gifu Prefecture
 Tokishi Station (Aichi) (時志駅), a former station in Aichi Prefecture